

282001–282100 

|-bgcolor=#f2f2f2
| colspan=4 align=center | 
|}

282101–282200 

|-bgcolor=#f2f2f2
| colspan=4 align=center | 
|}

282201–282300 

|-bgcolor=#f2f2f2
| colspan=4 align=center | 
|}

282301–282400 

|-bgcolor=#f2f2f2
| colspan=4 align=center | 
|}

282401–282500 

|-bgcolor=#f2f2f2
| colspan=4 align=center | 
|}

282501–282600 

|-bgcolor=#f2f2f2
| colspan=4 align=center | 
|}

282601–282700 

|-id=669
| 282669 Erguël ||  || Erguël, an ancient seigniory of the Catholic diocese of Basel, Switzerland || 
|}

282701–282800 

|-bgcolor=#f2f2f2
| colspan=4 align=center | 
|}

282801–282900 

|-id=897
| 282897 Kaltenbrunner ||  || Gerlinde Kaltenbrunner (born 1970), an Austrian mountaineer || 
|}

282901–283000 

|-id=903
| 282903 Masada ||  || Masada is an ancient fortification located on a plateau on the eastern edge of the Judaean desert. Herod the Great built palaces there. Masada is one of Israel's most popular tourist attractions and is a UNESCO World Heritage Site. || 
|}

References 

282001-283000